Moose Lake station in Moose Lake, Minnesota, United States, is a depot built in 1907 by the Soo Line Railroad.  The building was one of the few buildings that survived the 1918 Cloquet Fire, and it was used to provide shelter for those left homeless in the fires. It was listed on the National Register of Historic Places in 1994 as the Minneapolis, St. Paul, and Sault Ste. Marie Depot.

The railroad first built a depot in this location in 1873.  The 1918 Cloquet Fire started on October 12, 1918, with a background of a hot, dry summer, followed by a fall with little rain.  The fire started on a windy day when a spark, possibly thrown from a passing train, ignited nearby brush.  Much of the area, from Sturgeon Lake to Moose Lake, Cloquet, and close to Duluth, was devastated by the fire. It killed 453 people, and 52,000 homes were destroyed.  The American Red Cross housed the homeless in "fire shacks".  The residents of Moose Lake decided to rebuild the community.

Passenger train service to the Moose Lake station ended on May 16, 1959, when trains 64 and 65 were discontinued between Duluth and Thief River Falls. However, mixed train service between Glenwood and Superior through Moose Lake continued until at least 1962. 

The depot now serves as the Depot and Fires of 1918 Museum that tells the stories of the tragedy and the heroism brought out by the fire. The museum is operated by the Moose Lake Area Historical Society.

The Soo Line tracks are now gone, replaced by a recreational trail, the Soo Line Trail.

References

External links
 Moose Lake Area Historical Society

Buildings and structures in Carlton County, Minnesota
Former Soo Line stations
Museums in Carlton County, Minnesota
History museums in Minnesota
Railway stations on the National Register of Historic Places in Minnesota
Railway stations in the United States opened in 1907
National Register of Historic Places in Carlton County, Minnesota
Former railway stations in Minnesota
1907 establishments in Minnesota
Transportation in Carlton County, Minnesota
Natural disaster museums
Firefighting in Minnesota
Railway stations closed in 1959